Mohammad Aqa Aqajari (also Romanized as Moḩammad Āqā Āqājarī; also known as Keykāvūs-e Āghājārī and Moḩammad Āqājarī) is a village in Dodangeh Rural District, in the Central District of Behbahan County, Khuzestan Province, Iran. At the 2006 census, its population was 374, in 85 families.

References 

Populated places in Behbahan County